RR (a.k.a. Railroad) is a 2007 film by American filmmaker James Benning.

Themes
Shot in 16 mm film, as most of Benning's films are, RR is another in Benning's series of American experimental landscape films; this one focusing on trains and their surroundings. In Railroad, Benning explores themes of American consumerism and overconsumption in what Benning calls a "collaboration" with the trains themselves.

Summary
The film is an exercise in minimalist restraint for it is basically a series of static shots of trains. There is an empty frame, the train enters, then it passes and leaves. The obsessive gaze of Benning's fixed static frame causes the viewer to wait and watch, obsessing, like train fanatic Benning does, on the imagery of the locomotive and the exploration of the random colors of its cars, the machinery and the various American landscapes the trains are surrounded by.

References

External links
RR location list (new filmkritik)

MUBI

2000s avant-garde and experimental films
2007 films
Rail transport films
Films directed by James Benning
2000s American films